"Faget" is a song by the American nu metal band Korn. It is the sixth track from the band's self-titled debut studio album. The song is about how Korn's lead vocalist, Jonathan Davis, was bullied in high school for being into arts, wearing eyeliner, being into new wave music, and wearing frilly shirts. According to Jonathan Davis, he was constantly called names such as "faggot". Also, there was a rumor that Davis was gay.

Background, music and writing

"Faget" is about Korn's lead vocalist Jonathan Davis' time in high school where he was relentlessly teased and harassed by jocks for being into arts, wearing frilly shirts, being into new wave music (for example, Duran Duran) and wearing eyeliner. Many people assumed that Davis was gay and would call him names such as "faggot". Davis said:

"Faget" features an example of Korn's guitarists (James "Munky" Shaffer and Brian "Head" Welch) utilizing what they have dubbed the "Mr. Bungle chord". When speaking about the recording of "Faget", Welch said: "[Jonathan] moved in with us, with his girlfriend, and I remember sitting in the room he rented. I had my guitar in there and I wrote the riff. We just came up with the song "Faget" right then and there. It was the very beginning". Songfacts described "Faget" as "a very emotional and genuine song where Davis lashes out at his tormentors".

Personnel
Main personnel
 Jonathan Davis – vocals
 James "Munky" Shaffer – guitar
 Brian "Head" Welch – guitar, additional vocals
 Reginald "Fieldy" Arvizu – bass
 David Silveria – drums
Additional personnel
 Ross Robinson – production
 Eddy Schreyer – mastering
 Stephen Stickler – photography
 Jay Papke, Dante Ariola – art direction and design
 Chuck Johnson – engineering, mixing

References

Bibliography

Korn songs
Songs written by Jonathan Davis
Songs about bullying
LGBT-related songs
1994 songs
Nu metal songs